Parliamentary elections were held in the Kingdom of Serbia in early 1884. The governing Conservative Party won 58 of the 130 seats. King Milan appointed a further 44 members. Following the elections, Milutin Garašanin of the Progressive Party became Prime Minister.

Results

References

Serbia
Parliamentary
Elections in Serbia